WMBH (1560 AM, "Somo Sports Radio") is a radio station licensed to Joplin, Missouri. The station is a CBS Sports Radio affiliate. Its programming is also carried by K268CP 101.3 FM, licensed to Joplin.

History
The station was first licensed, as KQYX, on August 14, 1962 to William B. Bell in Joplin. On July 25, 2001 the station engaged in a two-way call letter and format swap, with AM 1560 KQYX becoming WMBH and receiving a sports format, and AM 1450 WMBH becoming KQYX.

On October 9, 2006, WMBH flipped formats from talk/sports to urban contemporary as "1560 The Beat".

In January 2022, WMBH rebranded as "Somo Sports Radio" and switched affiliations from Fox Sports Radio to CBS Sports Radio.

Previous logo

References

External links

FCC History Cards for WMBH (covering KQYX from 1962-1980)
Pioneer Broadcaster Award (WMBH 2005) (MSSU.edu)

Ω
1962 establishments in Missouri
Sports radio stations in the United States
Radio stations established in 1962